South Carolina Highway 66 (SC 66) is a  primary state highway in the state of South Carolina. It serves to connect the community of Joanna with nearby SC 56 and the town of Whitmire.

Route description
SC 66 is a two-lane rural highway that travels  from SC 56 to SC 72 in Whitmire. It connects to U.S. Route 76 (US 76) and Interstate 26 (I-26).  Predominantly in the Sumter National Forest, it meanders through forest lands; in Whitmire, it takes a couple of turns before reaching SC 72 via Central Avenue, Park Street and Glenn Street.

History
SC 66 was established in 1934 as a new primary routing, traversing from SC 56 to US 76/SC 2 in Goldville (now Joanna). In 1941 or 1942, a second SC 66 was created, from SC 706 in Eisons Crossroads to the Newberry-Laurens county line. In 1948, the two sections of SC 66 were connected, and was also extended east into Whitmire replacing part of SC 706.

South Carolina Highway 706

South Carolina Highway 706 (SC 706) was established in 1940 as a new primary routing from US 76/SC 2 in Jalapa to SC 7 in Whitmire. In 1948, SC 706 was decommissioned with its routing north of Eisons Crossroads becoming part of SC 66, while south of it was downgraded to secondary Jalapa Road (S-36-32).

Junction list

Joanna connector route

South Carolina Highway 66 Connector (SC 66 Conn.) is a connector route of SC 66 that exists southwest of Joanna. It connects SC 56 with SC 66 just northeast of the latter highway's western terminus. It is unnamed and is an unsigned highway.

See also

References

External links

 
 SC 66 at Virginia Highways' South Carolina Highways Annex
 Former SC 706 at Virginia Highways' South Carolina Highways Annex

066
Transportation in Laurens County, South Carolina
Transportation in Newberry County, South Carolina